A list of notable Guatemalans.

A

 Abularach, Rodolfo, painter
 Álvarez, José Luis (1917–2012), painter
 Jackie Amezquita (born 1985), performance artist
 Andrade, Sergio, musician (bassist founder of Lifehouse)
 Acuña, Angelina writer of prose and poetry
 Argueta, Luis, film director
 Arbenz Vilanova, Arabella, actress, model, socialite
 Arbenz, Jacobo (1913–1971), military officer, former president
 Manuel José Leonardo Arce Leal (1935-1985), poet and dramatist
 Arenales Catalán, Emilio (1922–1969), diplomat. Foreign minister of Guatemala from 1966 to 1969 and the president of the United Nations Twenty-Third General Assembly from 1968 to 1969.
 Arévalo, Juan José, first democratically elected president
 Arjona, Ricardo, international singer
 Asturias, Miguel Ángel, writer, winner of the Nobel Prize in literature (1967)
 Asturias, Rodrigo, guerrilla leader of ORPA, a.k.a. Comandante Gaspar Ilom, son of writer Miguel Ángel Asturias
 Ayala Acevedo, Allan, track athlete, national record holder in 400, 400 hurdles, and 1600 relay
 Aycinena y Piñol, Juan José, ecclesiastical and intellectual conservative in Central America

B
 Barrios, Justo Rufino, General, leader of the Liberal movement, dictator
 Barrondo, Erick, Olympic Silver medalist racewalker
 Batres Montúfar, José, writer
 Berganza, Eddie, writer, Executive Editor of DC Comics
 Bressani Castignoli, Ricardo, nutrition expert and biochemist
 Bosch Gutierrez, Felipe A., businessman
 Bosch Gutierrez, Juan Luis, businessman

C
 Cardoza y Aragón, Luis, writer, essayist, poet, art critic, and diplomat
 Carnage, DJ and music producer
 Carrera, Rafael, general, conservative politician, and President of Guatemala
 Castillo Armas, Carlos, colonel, politician
 Rafael Castillo Valdez, politician and diplomat
 Castillo, Otto René, poet, guerrilla member of FAR
 Chacón González, Lázaro Army General, former President
 Chinchilla Recinos, María (1909–1944), schoolteacher
 Cordón, Kevin, national badminton player
 Coroy, María Mercedes, Mayan actress
 Cumez, Paula Nicho, artist
 Curruchich, Sara, singer-songwriter
 del Águila, Cynthia (born 1959), Minister of Education 2012–2015

E
 Estrada Cabrera, Manuel, lawyer. Secretary of Foreign during Jose Maria Reina Barrios government. President of Guatemala from 1898 to 1920.
 Espada, Rafael, Vice President of Guatemala and former cardio-thoracic surgeon

F
 Flaquer Azurdia, Irma, journalist
 Flores, Mateo, athlete
 Alejandra Flores, soprano

G
 Franz Galich (1951–2007), writer
 Galeotti Torres, Rodolfo, sculptor
 García Granados y Saborío, María (1860–1878), socialite
 García Granandos y Zavala, María Josefa (1796–1848), intellectual, writer, journalist and poet
 García Laguardia, Jorge Mario, jurist, magistrate of the Constitutional Court, and Ombudsman for Human Rights
 Gerardi Conedera, Juan José, Roman Catholic bishop
 Goldman, Francisco, writer
 Gomez Carrillo, Enrique (1873–1927), writer
 González Palma, Luis, photographer
 Gutierrez, Juan José, businessman
 Dionisio Gutierrez Mayorga, businessman

H 
 Hendricks, Ted, retired American Football linebacker

I
 Isaac, Oscar, Guatemalan-American actor

J
 Jensen, Alfred Julio, artist

L
 La Rue, Frank William, human rights activist
 Lehnhoff, Dieter, composer, conductor, musicologist
 Lopez, Ed, Guatemalan-American politician
 Lopez, Antonio, Guatemalan-Mexican soccer player
 Lubitch Domecq, Alcina, writer
 Lucas García, Fernando Romeo, general, former President

M
 Mack, Myrna, anthropologist
 Marroquin, Manny, Grammy Award-winning mixer/engineer
 Martinez, Benito, American actor of Guatemalan descent
 Menchú, Rigoberta, winner of the Nobel Peace Prize (1992), indigenous woman, activist, author
 Menkos, Jonathan, politician, economist and writer
 Mérida, Carlos, painter
 Mendez, Francisco, (1907–1962) writer
 Milla y Vidaurre, José (Salome Jil) (1822–1882), writer
 Monteforte Toledo, Mario, writer
 Monterroso, Augusto, writer, winner of the Prince of Asturias Award of literature (2000)
 Monterroso, Sandra, visual artist and designer
 Montúfar y Rivera, Lorenzo (1823–1898), politician and lawyer.
 Morales, Jimmy, President of Guatemala
 Moreno, Gaby, singer and songwriter
 Mulet, Edmond, diplomat
 Óscar Murúa, artist

P
 Palencia, Karl M., Record Producer (Pina Records), aka Myztiko
 Palma, Gustavo Adolfo (1920–2010), singer, lyric tenor
Paniagua España, Carlos Eduardo (1915-1988), diplomat
 Pappa, Marco, Guatemalan national team and Seattle Sounders FC footballer
 Peña Aldana, Carlos Enrique, winner of Latin American Idol 2nd season
 Pezzarossi, Dwight, retired Guatemalan National Team and CSD Comunicaciones footballer
 Plata, Juan Carlos, retired Guatemalan National Team and CSD Municipal footballer

Q
 Quevedo, Fernando, Professor of theoretical physics, Cambridge, England
 Quezada Toruño, Rodolfo, Cardinal, Archbishop of Guatemala City

R
 Ramírez, Guillermo, retired Guatemalan national team footballer
 Ramirez de León, Arnoldo, guerrilla leader of EGP a.k.a. Comandante Rolando Morán
 Raudales, Henry, violinist
 Recinos, Adrián, lawyer, historian, Mayanist scholar, essayist, and diplomat
 Recinos, Efraín, engineer, architect, painter, sculptor, muralist, scenographer, inventor
 Robles, Rodolfo, physician, discovered onchocercosis (Robles disease)
 Rodriguez Macal, Virgilio, writer
 Ríos Montt, Efraín, general, dictator, stands accused of genocide
 Rodríguez Beteta, Virgilio (1885–1967), lawyer, historian, diplomat and writer
 Rosenthal, Gert, economist and diplomat
 Ruiz, Carlos, Guatemalan national team and CSD Municipal footballer

S
 Sandarti, Héctor, television personality
 Sandoval, Kevin, soccer player, 1988 Summer Olympics
 Saravia, Rodrigo, Guatemala national team footballer
 Shery, singer, songwriter and producer
 Soluna Samay, singer, songwriter

T
 Tecún Umán, sixteenth century leader of the K'iche' Maya people
 Tobar, Hector, writer/journalist
 Turcios Lima, Luis Augusto, Guatemalan army officer, guerrilla leader (FAR)

U
 Ubico, Jorge, military dictator
 Unger, David, author
 Urruela Federico, diplomat

V
 Villatoro, Anton, professional cyclist
 Villatoro, Alan, International Christian singer, music producer
 Viñals, Jaime, mountaineer (scaled seven highest peaks in the world)
 von Ahn, Luis, computer scientist, creator of CAPTCHA technology, professor of Carnegie Mellon University

W
 Whitbeck, Harris, CNN's International Correspondent based in Mexico City

Y
 Yela Günther, Rafael, sculptor
 Yon Sosa, Marco Antonio, Guatemalan army officer, guerrilla leader MR-NOV13

Z
 Zamora, José Rubén, journalist
 Zuniga, Daphne, Guatemalan-American actress

References